Palisade Crest is a jagged ridge in The Palisades's region of the Sierra Nevada southeast of Mount Sill and northwest of Middle Palisade. Its twelve pinnacles are unofficially named for characters from The Lord of the Rings by J. R. R. Tolkien.

The ridge marks the boundary between Kings Canyon National Park and the John Muir Wilderness.

Climate
According to the Köppen climate classification system, Palisade Crest is located in an alpine climate zone. Most weather fronts originate in the Pacific Ocean, and travel east toward the Sierra Nevada mountains. As fronts approach, they are forced upward by the peaks (orographic lift), causing them to drop their moisture in the form of rain or snowfall onto the range.

Gallery

See also
 Palisades of the Sierra Nevada

References

Mountains of Kings Canyon National Park
Mountains of the John Muir Wilderness
Mountains of Inyo County, California
Mountains of Fresno County, California
Mountains of Northern California